Crepidotus mollis is a species of mushroom. The common names of the species include peeling oysterling, soft slipper, and jelly crep.

Description
The cap is 1–5 cm wide and kidney shaped. The cap is white when it is young and when it gets older, it turns ochre. The flesh of the cap is white and flabby, and can be broken easily. It has brown fibrils and scales which wear away, leaving a smooth surface. The upper layer of the cap is elastic and can be stretched slightly at the margin. The gills are pale brown and soft. The spores are elliptical and smooth, producing a brown spore print. The stalk is rudimentary or lacking. Crepidotus crocophyllus looks similar to this species and is sometimes confused with it. The species resemble a globe in moist weather. The species has a relative large size compared to other species in the genus Crepidotus. The fungus Hypomyces tremellicola is a parasite that deforms this species' cap.

The species is reportedly inedible, and too small to consider worthwhile. Since very little is known about the edibility of the mushrooms in the genus Crepidotus, none should be eaten.

Similar species 
Similar species include Crepidotus applanatus, C. crocophyllus, and Pleurotus ostreatus.

Habitat
The species grows in groups or overlapping tiers on hardwood. The hardwood includes tree trunks, fallen branches, and sawdust. Rarely, the species grows on coniferous trees. The species is widely distributed and very common. The months that the species can commonly be found in are from July to September. The species can be found in temperate zones of North America, South America, and The British Isles. It can also be found in Europe during spring, summer, and autumn.

References

External links
Images of Crepidotus mollis

Inedible fungi
Crepidotaceae
Taxa named by Jacob Christian Schäffer